Silene villosa, the desert campion, is a therophyte and an annual plant of the family Caryophyllaceae and genus Silene. It has ascending and spreading branches of around 50 cm. It blooms from February to April and its flowers are white, tubular, and solitary.

References

External links

villosa